Low Temperature Physics  is a monthly peer-reviewed scientific journal covering all aspects of low temperature physics. The journal publishes original articles, review articles, brief communications, memoirs, and biographies. The editor-in-chief is Yurii G. Naidyuk. This is a translation of the journal Fizika Nizkikh Temperatur (in Russian), published by the B.Verkin Institute for Low Temperature Physics and Engineering of the National Academy of Sciences of Ukraine.

Abstracting and indexing  
The journal is abstracted and indexed in Current Contents/Physical, Chemical & Earth Sciences, Inspec, PASCAL, Physics Abstracts, Science Citation Index, and SPIN bibliographic database.

External links 
 

Physics journals
American Institute of Physics academic journals
Publications established in 1997
Monthly journals
English-language journals